Michael Dante (born Ralph Vitti; September 2, 1931) is an American actor and former professional minor league baseball player.

Early life
Dante was born Ralph Vitti in Stamford, Connecticut. Growing up, he would sneak into a local movie theater with his friends to watch westerns. "I grew up wanting to be the sidekick of The Lone Ranger and wanting to follow my heroes", Dante told a reporter in 2006. He was a shortstop on the Stamford High School baseball team, then played for "The Advocate All-Stars" team which won a 1949 New England baseball championship. After graduating from high school, Dante signed a bonus contract with the Boston Braves. He used his $6,000 bonus to buy his family a four-door Buick with whitewalls.

Career
During spring training with the former Washington Senators, Dante took drama classes at the University of Miami in Coral Gables, Florida. Bandleader Tommy Dorsey arranged a screen test for him at Metro-Goldwyn-Mayer. His first film, Somebody Up There Likes Me, was released in 1956. He changed his name at the urging of studio boss Jack L. Warner, who thought "Vitti" would not fit well on theater marquees. Warner suggested some first names, from which the actor picked "Michael". He chose the last name "Dante" because it had been used by some relatives.

Dante has appeared in 30 films and 150 television shows. He spent seven years in supporting roles under contract to three major studios at once: MGM, Warner Brothers and Twentieth Century Fox. He considers his best performances the role that he played in Killer Instinct on the CBS television series Desilu Playhouse, along with his roles in the movies Westbound (1959), Seven Thieves (1960) and Winterhawk (1975). His other film credits include Fort Dobbs (1958), Kid Galahad (1962), Operation Bikini (1963), The Naked Kiss (1964), Apache Rifles (1964), Harlow (1965), Arizona Raiders (1965), Willard (1971), That's the Way of the World (1975), The Farmer (1977), Missile X: The Neutron Bomb Incident (1978), Beyond Evil (1980), Return from the River Kwai (1989), and Cage (1989).

Dante appeared on a few  ABC/Warner Brothers series, including the westerns Colt .45 and Maverick. He appeared a couple times on the former, starring Wayde Preston. Dante and Forrest Lewis portrayed Davey Lewis and Willy Ford, respectively, in the 1957 episode "The $3,000 Bullet". Dante then played the role of Ab Saunders in the 1958 episode "The Deserters", with Angie Dickinson as Laura Meadows and Myron Healey as an unnamed fur trader, and directed by Leslie H. Martinson. On Maverick he portrayed the killer Turk Mason in the 1957 episode "The Third Rider", with Jack Kelly. Another ABC-WB series he appeared on was the crime drama, Bourbon Street Beat, with Andrew Duggan,  on the syndicated adventure series, Rescue 8, starring Jim Davis and Lang Jeffries, and in three episodes of CBS's The Texan, starring Rory Calhoun.

Dante made two guest appearances on Perry Mason starring Raymond Burr. In 1959 he played Arthur Manning in "The Case of the Dangerous Dowager", and in 1965 he played murder victim Douglas Kelland in "The Case of the Feather Cloak."

He appeared on Star Trek television series in the role of "Maab" in the 1967 episode, "Friday's Child" alongside Julie Newmar. Dante has appeared at Star Trek conventions.

In 1969, he played Clay Squires, a bitter young half-breed man, in the episode "Long Night at Fort Lonely" on the syndicated Death Valley Days, with Robert Taylor (actor) as Ben Cotterman and June Dayton as Cotterman's wife, Rachel and in 1972 he played a harried TV commercial director in My Three Sons. In 1974 he played Julio Tucelli in The Six Million Dollar Man episode, Dr. Wells Is Missing.

Dante also has recurring roles on the television serials Days of Our Lives and General Hospital.

In the 1970s, Dante met John Wayne, whom he watched on screen as a child. Wayne had seen Dante in Winterhawk and asked him to co-host a charity event in Newport Beach, California. That started a friendship between the two actors, and they co-hosted other events until Wayne's death in 1979.

Michael Dante hosted his own syndicated radio talk show, from 1995 to 2007, called On Deck and previously known as the Michael Dante Celebrity Talk Show. His program guests included Milton Berle, Tony Curtis, Ron Ely, Bryant Gumbel, Stack Pierce, Connie Stevens and Stella Stevens. An avid golfer, he once hosted the annual Michael Dante Celebrity Golf Tournament, a charitable fund-raiser held annually in Palm Springs, California, beginning in 1991.

In 2006, Dante told an interviewer that he had written a script for a sequel to Winterhawk and was trying to get funding for the projected movie.

Awards
 The Silver Spur Award (called the "Golden Globe of the Western film and television genre") presented by Reel Cowboys
 The Golden Boot Award ("the Oscar of Westerns")
 Southern California Motion Picture Council Award for the 'Best of the Best' in the Motion Picture Industry
 Wall of Fame Honoree – Stamford High School – Stamford, Connecticut
 Spirit of the West Award by Wild West Gazette/Bison Western Museum
 Palm Springs Film Festival Award for the Sammy Fuller classic film The Naked Kiss
 1994 – Golden Palm Star on the Walk of Stars
 Apacheland Days, Apache Junction, Arizona – Guest of Honor – Western boot prints in cement – Superstition Mountain Museum

Filmography

References

External links
 
 
 
 

1931 births
Living people
American male film actors
American male television actors
American talk radio hosts
Male actors from Stamford, Connecticut
Baseball players from Connecticut
Minor league baseball players
University of Miami alumni
People from Greater Los Angeles
Stamford High School (Stamford, Connecticut) alumni